R° (アール) is the debut album of Japanese singer-songwriter Rurutia. The album reached to No. 90 on Oricon and charted for a week.

Track listing

References

R°
Rurutia albums